Our Lady of the Assumption Church is a Roman Catholic church in Westport, Connecticut, part of the  Diocese of Bridgeport.

History
The first recorded Mass celebrated in Westport was said in 1853 by Rev. John Brady of Norwalk, in the Universalist Church on Main Street. For many years Westport was a mission of St. Mary's Church in Norwalk. A church built by Rev. Dr. Mulligan was dedicated on August 15, 1860. In 1876, Rev. M.P. Lawlor was made pastor in Fairfield, with responsibility for Westport as well.

References

External links 

 Our Lady of the Assumption - Website
 Diocese of Bridgeport

Roman Catholic churches in Connecticut
1860 establishments in Connecticut
Buildings and structures in Westport, Connecticut
Churches in Fairfield County, Connecticut